Mather Dighi is a village  and a gram panchayat within the jurisdiction of the Jibantala police station in the Canning II CD block in the Canning subdivision of the South 24 Parganas district in the Indian state of West Bengal.

Geography

Area overview
Canning subdivision has a very low level of urbanization. Only 12.37% of the population lives in the urban areas and 87.63% lives in the rural areas. There are 8 census towns in Canning I CD block and only 2 in the rest of the subdivision. The entire district is situated in the Ganges Delta with numerous islands in the southern part of the region. The area (shown in the map alongside) borders on the Sundarbans National Park and a major portion of it is a part of the Sundarbans settlements. It is a flat low lying area in the South Bidyadhari plains. The Matla River is prominent and there are many streams and water channels locally known as khals. A comparatively recent country-wide development is the guarding of the coastal areas with a special coastal force.

Note: The map alongside presents some of the notable locations in the subdivision. All places marked in the map are linked in the larger full screen map.

Location

Demographics
According to the 2011 Census of India, Mather Dighi  had a total population of 13,524, of which 6,836 (51%) were males and 6,688 (49%) were females. There were 2,247 persons in the age range of 0 to 6 years. The total number of literate persons in Mather Dighi was 8,258 (73.22% of the population over 6 years).

Transport
A stretch of a local road links Mather Dighi to the State Highway 3 (locally popular as the Basanti Highway).

Education
Mather Dighi High School is a Bengali-medium coeducational institution established in 1948. It has facilities for teaching from class V to class XII.

Healthcare
Mather Dighi Rural Hospital, with 30 beds, is the major government medical facility in the Canning II CD block.

References

Villages in South 24 Parganas district